Also known as the 13th Stoke Mandeville Games, the 1964 Summer Paralympics was the 2nd Paralympic Games. Hosted in Tokyo, the games ran from 8 to 12 November. Australia won a total of 30 medals (12 gold, 11 silver, and 7 bronze) and finished fourth on the medal tally behind Italy (3rd), Great Britain (2nd) and the United States (1st). Australia competed in 6 of the 9 sports at the Games, winning medals in each of those sports, but was most successful in the pool, winning a majority of their medals in swimming events.

Background

Prior to the 1964 Paralympic Games, some of the athletes competed in the 1962 Commonwealth Paraplegic Games in Perth whilst others competed in the Third 'National Paraplegic Games' in Adelaide in order to qualify for the Paralympic Games.

There was no selection process for the venue of the 1964 Paralympic Games, it simply went to the city that had hosted the Olympics as it had 4 years ago in Rome (1960). Also there is no record of a Paralympic flame or mascot at these games.

The Australian team left Sydney for Tokyo on 5 November 1964, comprising 25 athletes, staff and others, having conducted final preparations and briefing at Prince Henry's Hospital. On 7 November, the team attended a reception hosted by the Governor of Tokyo Dr Royotaro Ayuimo. The opening ceremony was held the following day, involving 375 competitors and 144 medal events in 9 sports.

Australians encountered two issues at the games, the first being the weather and the second was the timing of the games. On the first day athletes faced bitterly cold headwinds which effected the discus, shot put and javelin events causing the events to be restarted. Timing was also tight, as the games only lasted a total of four and a half days. This made for a very busy schedule for athletes competing in multiple events. However, despite these issues the games were given a glowing review by members of the Australian Paralympic team. The events were well organised and the athletes were treated with a sense of legitimacy and professionalism that had so far been absent from disability sport. One Australian athlete recalls, "At the village we [were] halted by a magnificent entrance welcoming us with flags, banners and posters for the Paralympics. It was clear that Japan had decided to show their visitors the hospitality and efficiency that she had shown the Olympic Visitors".

Team

Australia sent 15 athletes to the 1964 Summer Paralympics.

The team members were:

Accompanying the team were 8 escorts, all with specific roles to play within the team:

– Dr George Bedbrook (Team Leader & Medical Officer)

– Johnno Johnston (Manager & Remedial Gymnast)

– Margaret Buzacott (Nurse)

– Kevin Betts (Attendant)

– Bill Gibbs (Attendant)

– K. Pinschers (Coach)

– Tim Timmermans (Coach)

– Cyril Thomas (Baggage Master)

Medalists

| width="78%" align="left" valign="top" |

| width="22%" align="left" valign="top" |

Events

Archery

Daphne Ceeney won bronze in the Women's Albion Round open with a score of 538.  Roy Fowler won silver in the Men's St. Nicholas Round open with a score of 700.  Lionel Cousins, Roy Fowler and John Martin won silver in the Men's St. Nicholas Round Team open with a score of 1995.

Athletics

Bill (William) Mather-Brown (60m, Club Throw, Discus Throw, Precision Javelin, Javelin Throw, Shot Put, Slalom), 4x40m Relay?
Frank Ponta (Club Throw, Discus Throw, Precision Javelin, Javelin Throw, Shot Put) 4x40m?
Mike Dow (60m, Club Throw, Discus Throw, Javelin Throw, Shot Put, Slalom), 4x40m?
John Martin (Club Throw, Shot Put)
Vic Renalson (Discus Throw)

Marion O'Brien won a silver medal in the Women's Javelin C with a throw of 10.27 metres.

Elaine Schreiber won a gold medal in the Women's Club Throw A with a throw of 17.31 metres and won a silver medal in the Women's Javelin A with a throw of 9.26 metres.

Gary Hooper won a gold medal in the Men's Wheelchair Dash above T10.

Australia won a silver medal in the Men's Wheelchair Relay above T10.

Dartchery

Australia was represented by Roy Farmer and his partner with Lionel Cousens and Trevor French and his partner with John Martin.

Snooker

Australia did not compete in Snooker at the 1964 Summer Paralympics.

Swimming

Trevor French won a silver medal in the Men's 25 m Freestyle Supine complete class 2 with a time of 31.6 seconds.
 
Daphne Ceeney won a silver medal in the Women's 50 m Freestyle Prone complete class 5 with a time of 40.1 seconds and she won a bronze medal in the Women's 50 m Freestyle Supine cauda equina with a time of 56.4 seconds.

Michael Dow won a gold medal in the Men's 50 m Freestyle Supine incomplete class 3 with a time of 49.7 seconds. He won another gold medal in the Men's 50 m Breaststroke incomplete class 3 with a time of 59.6 seconds. He also won a bronze medal in the Men's 50 m Freestyle Prone incomplete class 3 with a time of 50.9 seconds.

Frank Ponta won a gold medal in the Men's 25 m Freestyle Supine complete class 2 with a time of 30.0 seconds.

Elizabeth Edmondson was the youngest competitor at the games at the age of just 14 years old. Edmondson won a gold medal in the Women's 50 m Breaststroke cauda equina with a time of 1:04.6, a world record. She won a second gold medal in the Women's 50 m Freestyle Prone complete class 5 with a time of 39.7 seconds, a world record. And she won a third gold medal in the Women's 50 m Freestyle Supine cauda equina with a time of 50.8 seconds, another world record. At the conclusion of the 1964 Games, Edmondson's parents acknowledged that swimming had greatly helped their daughter, but felt that she needed to quit the sport and concentrate on her education because swimming would not provide her with standing in life. After the 1964 games, Edmondson returned home and prepared for school exams.

Roy Fowler won a gold medal in the Men's 25 m Breaststroke complete class 1 with a time of 45.6 seconds. He won a second gold medal in the Men's 25 m Freestyle Prone complete class 1 with a time of 38.3 seconds. He won a third gold medal in the Men's 25 m Freestyle Supine complete class 1 with a time of 41.0 seconds.

Table Tennis

Allan McLucas won a bronze medal in the Men's Singles A2.

Elaine Schreiber won a bronze medal in the Women's Singles B.

Marion O'Brien won a bronze medal in the Women's Singles C.

Daphne Ceeney and Marion O'Brien won a gold medal in the Women's Doubles C.

Weightlifting

Weightlifting was the only completely new sport added to the Paralympics this year. Michael Dow won a silver medal in the Men's Featherweight with a lift of 95 kg.

Gary Hooper won a silver medal in the Men's Lightweight.

Vic Renalson won a silver medal in the Men's Heavyweight with a lift of 155 kg. Vic went on to compete in weightlifting and medal in 1968, 1972 and 1976 representing Australia in 4 consecutive Paralympic games.

Wheelchair basketball

Australia did not field a wheelchair basketball team at the 1964 Summer Paralympics.

Wheelchair fencing

Daphne Ceeney won a bronze medal in the Women's Foil Individual.

Frank Ponta won a silver medal in the Men's Foil Novice Individual.

Competition Venues
Although the games used the same village from the Olympic Games, most of the sporting facilities differed from those used in the Olympic Games. The National gymnasium and the National Gymnasium Annexe were the only venues used for both games. Overall, the sports were spread across seven venues. These included: 
 Oda Field: (Athletics and the Opening Ceremony)
 National Gymnasium: (Snooker, Table Tennis and Weightlifting)
 National Gymnasium Annexe: (Indoor Basketball venue and Closing Ceremony) 
 Basketball Venue (Outdoor).
 Archery and Dartchery Venue.
 Tokyo Metropolitan Indoor Swimming Pool.
 Fencing venue.

Opening ceremony
The opening ceremony was held on Sunday 8 November at 10.00 am on the 'Oda' Track and Field stadium. Emperor Akihito (who was the Japanese Crown Prince in 1964) and his wife Empress Michiko (who was the Japanese Crown Princess) attended the opening ceremony and officially opened the Games. The ceremony began with a colourful, flag-waving procession of 375 athletes across the represented 21 countries.
This procession was led by a marching band of young Japanese girls. Speeches from the Crown Prince and other representatives transpired before Japanese swimmer Shigeo Aono took the athlete's oath. What followed was the release of hundreds of pigeons into the air. To conclude the opening ceremony, a demonstration of traditional Japanese fencing was undertaken by members of the Defence Force.

Closing ceremony

Before 1964, the Paralympics had not held an official closing ceremony in accordance with the tradition of the Stoke Mandeville Games, however Tokyo was the first to stage a formal closing ceremony setting a new tradition for subsequent events. The ceremony was held on Thursday 12 November at 5.00pm in the Olympic Gymnasium Annexe, "a grand amphitheatre", according to Australian Paraplegic. Once again it was attended by the Crown Prince and Princess who gave out numerous special prizes to the outstanding athletes of the Games in front of over 5000 spectators. Sir Ludwig Guttmann attended and gave a speech thanking the Japanese people and the organising committee for putting on such a wonderful event.  "Everybody present collectively sang Auld Lang Syne and as the sound of thousands of people joining together rang out, the atmosphere was unforgettable and truly celebratory". The impact of the Games was felt when Japanese students and children raced to catch the hats of the athletes and participants who tossed them into the gathering crowds.

Athlete's Reflection of the Games
Wheelchair Fencer Bill Mather-Brown: "Tokyo was way above Stoke Mandeville of '57 and the previous 1960 Rome Paralympics." "Athletes were far more highly trained and the Japanese conducted the whole affair in a most business-like manner".

Swimmer and Weightlifter Michael Dow: "I went there with absolutely no idea of how competitive the events would be". "I was quite chuffed with the two gold medals".

Swimmer Elizabeth Edmondson: 
"At the time I didn’t know how much the Paralympic Movement would grow because not much of a fuss was made". "My parents couldn’t come with me and there wasn’t much coverage of what happened".

"Without the Paralympic Games being accessible to the general public and without results being readily available, families and friends of athletes would eagerly await telegrams to hear the results of their loved ones", Edmondson recalls.
"My parents received a telegram about my gold medals when I was in Tokyo and my sister remembers being called out of class as an eight year old to be told the news".

Edmondson also recalls the tight schedule and the events she competed in during the games. "I swam all three events on one night with no heats and there were only 25m and 50m events".

See also
 Australia at the Paralympics

References

Further reading
Several oral histories are available online from Australian athletes who competed at the Games.
 Kevin Coombs interviewed by Robin Poke in the Australian Centre for Paralympic Studies oral history project, National Library of Australia, 2010
 Daphne Hilton (nee Ceeney) interviewed by Robin Poke in the Australian Centre for Paralympic Studies oral history project, National Library of Australia, 2010
 Gary Hooper interviewed by Rob Willis in the Australian Centre for Paralympic Studies oral history project, National Library of Australia, 2010
 Frank Ponta interviewed by Robin Poke in the Australian Centre for Paralympic Studies oral history project, National Libraty of Australia, 2010
 Bill Mather-Brown interviewed by Robin Poke in the Australian Centre for Paralympic Studies oral history project, National Library of Australia, 2010
 John Martin interviewed by Ian Jobling in the Australian Centre for Paralympic Studies oral history project, National Library of Australia, 2012
 Elizabeth Edmonson interviewed by Ian Jobling in the Australian Centre for Paralympic Studies oral history project, National Library of Australia, 2012

External links
Paralympics Games history – Summer

Nations at the 1964 Summer Paralympics
1960
Paralympics